The 1911 Villanova Wildcats football team represented Villanova University in the 1911 college football season. Led by Fred Crolius in his eighth and final year as head coach, Villanova compiled a record of 0–5–1 record. The 1911 campaign was the second of two consecutive winless seasons for Villanova.

Schedule

References

Villanova
Villanova Wildcats football seasons
College football winless seasons
Villanova Wildcats Football